The Vietnam gecko (Gekko vietnamensis) is a species of gecko. It is endemic to Vietnam.

References

Gekko
Reptiles described in 2010
Endemic fauna of Vietnam
Reptiles of Vietnam